Ariel Roberto Pereyra Legallais (born 11 November 1973) is a retired Argentine–born Chilean footballer that has played at Godoy Cruz, Venezuela and several clubs in Chile.

Club career
Pereyra began his career at Godoy Cruz Antonio Tomba, professional club of his natal city Mendoza. There he played more than 100 games and scored 26 goals. In 1998, he moved to Chile and joined to Santiago Wanderers. He had an unsuccessful spell at Valparaíso's side. That season Wanderers was relegated to the Primera B after finishing in the annual table's bottom. Following a brief spell in Coquimbo Unido in 2001, the incoming year he moved to Everton (Wanderers' archi–rival), where he helped the team to won the 2003 Primera B championship (Chile second-level tournament).

In June 2005, after the entire 2004 in Venezuelan football playing for Italmaracaibo, Pereyra returned to Chile, signing for Unión La Calera, where he coincided with players such as Víctor Rivero and Christian Riffo. There he broke a record after reaching score more than 100 goals in the Chilean football. In 2008 he was Primera B tournament goalscorer.

In late 2010, he left Unión La Calera after five years playing there. After his unusual decision to disassociate from Unión La Calera (considering which the team achieved the promotion to 2011 Primera División de Chile season), then he moved to Curicó Unido, when he played two seasons (2011 and 2012).

Managerial career
In 2021, he was the manager of San Antonio Unido in the Segunda División Profesional de Chile. In 2022, he worked as the manager of Deportes Melipilla.

Honours

Club
Everton
 Primera B (1): 2003

Unión La Calera
 Primera B (1): Runner-up 2010

Individual
 Primera B goalscorer (2): 2010, 2011

References

External links
 Ariel Pereyra at Football-Lineups
 

1973 births
Living people
Sportspeople from Mendoza, Argentina
Argentine footballers
Argentine expatriate footballers
Argentine emigrants to Chile
Naturalized citizens of Chile
Chilean footballers
Godoy Cruz Antonio Tomba footballers
Santiago Wanderers footballers
Everton de Viña del Mar footballers
Coquimbo Unido footballers
Deportivo Italia players
Unión La Calera footballers
Curicó Unido footballers
Primera B de Chile players
Chilean Primera División players
Venezuelan Primera División players
Expatriate footballers in Chile
Expatriate footballers in Venezuela
Argentine expatriate sportspeople in Chile
Argentine expatriate sportspeople in Venezuela
Chilean expatriate sportspeople in Venezuela
Association football forwards
Argentine football managers
Expatriate football managers in Chile
Chilean football managers
Unión La Calera managers
Deportes Concepción (Chile) managers
Magallanes managers
San Marcos de Arica managers
Deportes La Serena managers
Deportes Melipilla managers
Chilean Primera División managers
Primera B de Chile managers
Segunda División Profesional de Chile managers